Drysdale Island is a large but low-lying island in the Wessel Islands group in the Northern Territory of Australia. It measures  in area.

The only settlement is Yirringa, a small family Aboriginal outstation at the northeastern end.

There are numerous small lakes within it which are easily accessed by the tide, some of which are submerged for prolonged periods of time.

The easternmost point of the island is called Dale Point.

References

Islands of the Northern Territory